Anna Pellissier (24 March 1927 – 14 June 2017) was an Italian alpine skier. She competed in three events at the 1956 Winter Olympics.

References

External links
 

1927 births
2017 deaths
Italian female alpine skiers
Olympic alpine skiers of Italy
Alpine skiers at the 1956 Winter Olympics
Sportspeople from Aosta Valley